Salarias luctuosus is a species of combtooth blenny found in coral reefs in the northwest Pacific ocean.  This species reaches a length of  SL.

References

External links
 

luctuosus
Taxa named by Gilbert Percy Whitley
Fish described in 1929